The men's beach volleyball tournament at the 2016 Olympic Games in Rio de Janeiro, Brazil, took place at the Copacabana Stadium. The competition was held from 6 to 18 August 2016. Twenty four teams with 48 athletes around the world competed for the gold medal.

The medals for the tournament were presented by Bernard Rajzman, Brazil, member of the International Olympic Committee, and the gifts were presented by Dr. Ary Graça Filho, President of the Fédération Internationale de Volleyball.

Qualification

Pools composition
Twenty four teams were drawn in six pools of four teams. The top six teams from the FIVB beach volleyball Olympic ranking as of 12 June 2016 were seeded at the first row of each pools from pool A to F. The seventh to ninth from the ranking were drawn first in pool F, E, or D. Then, the tenth to twelfth were drawn in pool C, B, or A. The drawing of lots number three belonged the thirteenth to seventeenth teams. They were drawn in pool A to E. The remaining spot of third row were one of five confederation continental cup champions. Next, the four remaining were drawn in pool F to C. Finally the winners and runners-up from World continental cup were drawn last two spots. The teams from the same national Olympic committee could not be the same pool, except the last drawing.

Draw

Venue

Format
The preliminary round was a competition between the twenty four teams divided into six groups of four teams. This round, the teams competed in a single round-robin format. The two highest ranked teams in each group and the two best third ranked teams advanced automatically to the knockout stage. The other four third ranked teams faced the lucky loser playoffs to take the last two spots. The fourth placed teams in each pool were ranked nineteenth in this competition. The losers from the lucky loser playoffs were tied seventeenth. The knockout stage followed the single-elimination format. The losers in the round of sixteen were ranked ninth. The four quarter-final losers finished fifth. The winners of the semi-finals competed for gold medals and the losers played for bronze medals.

Pool standing procedure
 Match points (2 for the winner, 1 for the loser, 0 for forfeit)
 Between 2 teams consider all teams points ratio / Between 3 teams consider head-to-head points ratio
 Seeding position of the pools composition

Referees
The following referees were selected for the tournament.

 Osvaldo Sumavil
 Mário Ferro
 Elizir Martins de Oliveira
 Lucie Guillemette
 Wang Lijun
 Juan Carlos Saavedra
 Charalampos Papadogoulas
 Davide Crescentini
 Mariko Satomi
 Carlos L. Rivera Rodriguez
 Roman Pristovakin
 Giovanni Bake
 José Maria Padron
 Jonas Personeni
 Kritsada Panaseri
 Daniel Apol

Preliminary round
All times are Brasília Time (UTC−03:00).

Pool A

Pool B

Pool C

Pool D

Pool E

Pool F

Lucky losers
The table below shows the ranking of third-placed teams in the preliminary round. The top two teams will advance to next round automatically. The other teams will compete for the two remaining spots. The third-ranked team will play with the sixth-ranked team, and the fourth-ranked team will play with the fifth-ranked team.

Lucky loser playoffs

Knockout stage
The round of sixteen pair up weer determined by drawing of lots. The six first ranked teams in preliminary pools were separated automatically. Then, the lucky loser playoffs winners were drawn. The two best third ranked were drawn next. And, the last drawing belonged to the second ranked teams. The teams in the same pool from preliminary round could not meet in round of 16.

Round of 16

Quarterfinals

Semifinals

Bronze medal game

Gold medal game

Final ranking

See also
Beach volleyball at the 2016 Summer Olympics – Women's tournament

References

External links
Official website

beach
2016 in beach volleyball
2016